Tilted Mountain is a  mountain summit located in Banff National Park, in the Canadian Rockies of Alberta, Canada. It is part of the Sawback Range. Its nearest higher peak is Lychnis Mountain,  to the east in an area of exposed Skoki Formation limestone which is known for fossils such as brachiopods, gastropods, conodonts, cephalopods, trilobites, and echinoderm fragments.


History

Tilted Mountain was named in 1911 by James F. Porter for the tilted layers of rock strata. The mountain's name was officially adopted in 1924 when approved by the Geographical Names Board of Canada.

Geology

Like other mountains in Banff Park, Tilted Mountain is composed of sedimentary rock laid down during the Precambrian to Jurassic periods. Formed in shallow seas, this sedimentary rock was pushed east and over the top of younger rock during the Laramide orogeny.

Climate

Based on the Köppen climate classification, Tilted Mountain is located in a subarctic climate zone with cold, snowy winters, and mild summers. Temperatures can drop below −20 °C with wind chill factors below −30 °C.

See also
Geography of Alberta
Geology of Alberta

References

External links
 Weather forecast: Tilted Mountain
 Parks Canada web site: Banff National Park

Two-thousanders of Alberta
Mountains of Banff National Park
Alberta's Rockies
Canadian Rockies